Daniel 'Danny' C. Hamrick (born April 27, 1988 in Clarksburg, West Virginia) is an American politician and a former Republican member of the West Virginia House of Delegates representing District 48 from 2012 to 2022.

Education
Hamrick graduated from Liberty High School and attended Fairmont State University.

Elections

2006 Initially in District 41, Hamrick ran in the four-way 2006 Republican Primary to challenge incumbent Democratic Representatives Cann, Fragale, Iaquinta, and Miley, but lost the eight-way four-position November 7, 2006 General election to the incumbents.
2008 To again challenge the incumbent Democratic Representatives, Hamrick was unopposed for the May 13, 2008 Republican Primary, winning with 3,810 votes, setting up a rematch, but placed fifth in the five-way four-position November 4, 2008 General election.
2010 Hamrick ran in the five-way May 11, 2010 Republican Primary and placed first with 2,745 votes (26.1%), setting up his third contest with them, but again placed fifth in the eight-way four-position November 2, 2010 General election to the incumbents.
2012 Redistricted to District 48, Hamrick ran in the five-way May 8, 2012 Republican Primary and placed first with 2,984 votes (26.7%), and placed fourth in the eight-way four-position November 6, 2012 General election with 12,096 votes (13.5%), behind incumbent Democratic Representatives Tim Miley, Richard Iaquinta, and Sam Cann, and ahead of non-selectees incumbent Democratic Representative Ron Fragale and fellow Republican nominees Diana Bartley (who had run in 2010), Terry Woodside, and Ed Randolph.
2014 Hamrick was elected to his second term in the WV House of Delegates. He came in third place behind incumbent Tim Miley and Clarksburg City Councilman Patsy Trecost. Newcomer and fellow Republican, Terry Waxman, joined Delegate Hamrick taking the fourth spot in the House for the 48th District.

References

External links
Official page at the West Virginia Legislature
Campaign site

Danny Hamrick at Ballotpedia
Danny Hamrick at OpenSecrets

1988 births
Living people
Fairmont State University alumni
Republican Party members of the West Virginia House of Delegates
Politicians from Clarksburg, West Virginia
21st-century American politicians